Jules and Jim is a 1962 French New Wave romantic drama film, directed, produced and written by François Truffaut. Set before and after World War I, it describes a tragic love triangle involving French Bohemian Jim (Henri Serre), his shy Austrian friend Jules (Oskar Werner), and Jules's girlfriend and later wife Catherine (Jeanne Moreau).

The film is based on Henri-Pierre Roché's 1953 semi-autobiographical novel describing his relationship with young writer Franz Hessel and Helen Grund, whom Hessel married.
Truffaut came across the book in the mid-1950s while browsing through some secondhand books at a shop along the Seine in Paris. He later befriended the elderly Roché, who had published his first novel at the age of 74. The author approved of the young director's interest in adapting his work to another medium.

The film won the 1962 Grand Prix of French film prizes, the Étoile de Cristal, and Jeanne Moreau won that year's prize for best actress.
The film ranked 46 in Empire magazine's "The 100 Best Films Of World Cinema" in 2010.

Plot
The film is set before, during, and after the Great War in several different parts of France, Austria, and Germany. Jules (Oskar Werner) is a shy writer from Austria who forges a friendship with the more extroverted Frenchman Jim (Henri Serre). They share an interest in the world of the arts and the Bohemian lifestyle. At a slide show, they become entranced with a bust of a goddess and her serene smile and travel to see the ancient statue on an island in the Adriatic Sea.

After encounters with several women, they meet the free-spirited, capricious Catherine (Jeanne Moreau), a doppelgänger for the statue with the serene smile. The three become inseparable. Although she begins a relationship with Jules, both men are affected by her presence and her attitude toward life. Jim continues to be involved with his girlfriend Gilberte, usually seeing her apart from the others. A few days before war is declared, Jules and Catherine move to Austria to get married. Both men serve during the war, on opposing sides; each fears throughout the conflict the potential for facing the other or learning that he might have killed his friend.

After the wartime separation, Jim visits, and later stays with, Jules and Catherine in their chalet in the Black Forest. Jules and Catherine by then have a young daughter, Sabine. Jules confides the tensions in their marriage. He tells Jim that Catherine torments and punishes him at times with numerous affairs, and she once left him and Sabine for three months.

She flirts with and attempts to seduce Jim, who has never forgotten her. Jules, fearful that Catherine might leave him forever, gives his blessing for Jim to marry Catherine so that he may continue to visit them and see her. For a while, the three adults live happily with Sabine in the chalet, until tensions between Jim and Catherine arise because of their inability to have a child.

Jim leaves Catherine and returns to Paris. After several exchanges of letters between Catherine and Jim, they resolve to reunite when she learns that she is pregnant. The reunion does not occur after Jules writes to tell Jim that Catherine suffered a miscarriage.

After a time, Jim runs into Jules in Paris. He learns that Jules and Catherine have returned to France. Catherine tries to win Jim back, but he rebuffs her, saying he is going to marry Gilberte. Furious, she pulls a gun on him, but he wrestles it away and flees. He later encounters Jules and Catherine in a famous (at that time) movie theater, the Studio des Ursulines.

The three of them stop at an outdoor cafe. Catherine asks Jim to get into her car, saying she has something to tell him. She asks Jules to watch them and drives the car off a damaged bridge into the river, killing herself and Jim. Jules is left to bury the ashes of his friends in the Père-Lachaise Cemetery columbarium; Catherine wanted her ashes to be scattered in the wind from a hilltop, but at the time it wasn't legal.

Cast

 Jeanne Moreau as Catherine
 Oskar Werner as Jules
 Henri Serre as Jim
 Vanna Urbino as Gilberte, Jim's fiancée
 Serge Rezvani (credited under the name "Boris Bassiak") as Albert, Catherine's sometime lover
 Marie Dubois as Thérèse, Jules' ex-girlfriend
 Sabine Haudepin as Sabine, Jules and Catherine's daughter
 Kate Noëlle as Birgitta
 Anny Nelsen as Lucy
 Christiane Wagner as Helga
 Jean-Louis Richard as a customer in cafe
 Michel Varesano as a customer in cafe
 Pierre Fabre as a drunk in the cafe
 Danielle Bassiak as Albert's companion
 Bernard Largemains as Merlin
 Elen Bober as Mathilde
 Dominique Lacarrière as a woman
 Michel Subor as the Narrator (voice)

Style

French New Wave 
Jeanne Moreau incarnates the style of the French New Wave actress. The critic Ginette Vincendeau has defined this as, "beautiful, but in a kind of natural way; sexy, but intellectual at the same time, a kind of cerebral sexuality—this was the hallmark of the nouvelle vague woman." Though she isn't in the film's title, Catherine is "the structuring absence. She reconciles two completely opposed ideas of femininity."

Music 
According to New York Times film critic Bosley Crowther, "the emotional content is largely carried in the musical score" by Georges Delerue, which he lauded as "a dominant element in the film". The soundtrack was named as one of the "10 best soundtracks" by Time magazine in its "All Time 100 Movies" list.

Awards and nominations

Influences
According to ShortList, "The pacy energy of GoodFellas (1990) was influenced by Scorsese’s love of French New Wave cinema, especially François Truffaut’s doomed love triangle classic Jules et Jim. He wanted a similar voiceover to open, along with extensive narration, quick cuts and freeze frame shots. He called it a 'punk attitude' towards film convention, mirroring the attitude of the gangsters in the film."

The production of Jules et Jim was the subject of a documentary directed in 2009 by Thierry Tripod.

Further reading

References

External links
 
 
 
 Jules and Jim on New Wave Film.com
 Centurofy  Film, Guardian Unlimited
On Jules and Jim an essay by John Powers at the Criterion Collection
 Review  by Roger Ebert

1962 films
1962 romantic drama films
French romantic drama films
1960s French-language films
French black-and-white films
Films based on French novels
Films set in Paris
Films set in France
Films set in the Black Forest
Films set in the 1910s
Films set in the 1920s
Films set in the 1930s
Films directed by François Truffaut
Films with screenplays by François Truffaut
Films scored by Georges Delerue
1960s buddy films
Films about threesomes
1960s French films
French World War I films